This is a list of the 7 members of the European Parliament for Slovenia in the 2009 to 2014 session. One person from Democratic Party entered the Parliament in December 2011, bringing the number of MEPs to 8.

List

Party representation

Notes

2009
List
Slovenia